The International Criminal Court Act 2001 (c.17) is an Act of the Parliament of the United Kingdom.  The Act incorporates into English law and Northern Ireland law the Rome Statute of the International Criminal Court.

The principal aims of the Act are:
to incorporate into domestic law the offences contained in the Rome Statute (genocide, war crimes and crimes against humanity);
to fulfill the United Kingdom's obligations under the Statute, particularly in relation to the arrest and surrender of persons wanted by the International Criminal Court (ICC) and the provision of assistance with respect to ICC investigations; and
to create a legal framework so that persons convicted by the ICC can serve prison sentences in the United Kingdom.

In 2006, three British military personnel were charged with inhumane treatment, a war crime, under the Act.  Two of the three soldiers were cleared but the third, Corporal Donald Payne, became the first British person to be convicted of a war crime under this act, when he admitted to inhumanly treating Baha Mousa.

The corresponding Act of the Scottish Parliament is the International Criminal Court (Scotland) Act 2001 (asp 13).

Commencement Orders
The International Criminal Court Act 2001 (Commencement) Order 2001 (S.I. 2001/2161) (C.69) HTML PDF
The International Criminal Court Act 2001 (Commencement) (Amendment) Order 2001] (S.I. 2001/2304) (C.77) HTML PDF

See also
Human rights in the United Kingdom
International criminal law
Völkerstrafgesetzbuch

References

External links
International Criminal Court Act 2001 — text of the Act at the Office of Public Sector Information

United Kingdom Acts of Parliament 2001
International Criminal Court
Human rights in the United Kingdom